Davydovo is a rural locality (a selo) in Vtorovskoye Rural Settlement, Kameshkovsky District, Vladimir Oblast, Russia. The population was 86 as of 2010.

Geography 
Davydovo is located 30 km southwest of Kameshkovo (the district's administrative centre) by road. Filyandino is the nearest rural locality.

References 

Rural localities in Kameshkovsky District
Vladimirsky Uyezd